Lieutenant General Thomas L. Baptiste was Deputy Chairman, NATO Military Committee, Brussels, Belgium. He entered the United States Air Force in 1973.  He has held various leadership positions, and has commanded a fighter squadron, operations group and the Cheyenne Mountain Operations Center, Cheyenne Mountain Air Station, Colo.

General Baptiste is a command pilot and has flown nearly 3,000 hours, including nearly 60 combat hours in the F-16 supporting Operation PROVIDE COMFORT.

In 1973 he earned a Bachelor of Science degree in business administration-finance, from California State University, Chico. 

In 2010, Lt. Gen. Thomas L. Baptiste was appointed president and executive director of the National Center for Simulation, a non-profit, national membership organization (based in Orlando, Florida) which works to expand awareness of simulation modeling, training and applications for the military, healthcare, transportation, education and technology sectors.

References

American aviators
United States Air Force generals
People from Chico, California
1951 births
Living people
California State University, Chico alumni
Military personnel from California